is a 1993 original video animation of the popular 1970's anime Time Bokan.

This was the last installment of the series to feature the late Kei Tomiyama as the narrator. He was replaced in Time Bokan 2000: Kaitou Kiramekiman by Junpei Takiguchi and Kōichi Yamadera in the 2008 remake of Yatterman. The OVAs were initially licensed by Central Park Media and was released on DVD in 2005. Sentai Filmworks has now licensed the OVA series.

Episodes
There were only two volumes released as listed below.

Cast
Majo, Doronjo, Mujo, Atasha, Milenjo, Munmun, Yanyan: - Noriko Ohara
Glocky, Boyakki, Tobokkee, Sekobicchi, Jurii Kokematsu, Kosuinen, Dasainen - Jōji Yanami
Walther, Tonzura, Donjuro, Twarusky, Alan Sukadon, Kyokantin, Tonmentan - Kazuya Tatekabe
Dokurobe, Dogurobe - Junpei Takiguchi
Gekigasky, Baron Donfanfan, 2-3 - Masayuki Yamamoto
Daiko-kami - Hiroaki Tanabe
Ohana-chan - Kumiko Takizawa
Fortune Teller, Female High Schooler, Orokabu, Oshii Person - Yōko Yano
Salaryman, Monzaemon, Bikkuri Mondo, Ikemasuitachi - Katsumi Suzuki
Koyama Cameraman - Takao Koyama
Narration, Sasayaki Reporter, Tommy Yama, Turnabout King, Buta, Yatterwan FZ - Kei Tomiyama
Ohayashi People - Hiroto Kōmoto, Kahiro Okuya
Gan-chan (Yatterman-1) - Yoshiko Ōta
Ai-chan (Yatterman-2) - Mari Okamoto
Omochama - Reiko Katsura
Ken the Eagle, Tekkaman - Katsuji Mori
Jun the Swan, Tenburu - Kazuko Sugiyama
Polymar - Kazuyuki Sogabe
Casshern - Ikuo Nishikawa
Loliconda, Sailor Munmun, Obanbar - Naoko Matsui

References

External links
New from Japan: Anime Film Reviews
 

1993 anime OVAs
Anime with original screenplays
Central Park Media
Science fiction anime and manga
Sentai Filmworks
Tatsunoko Production
Time Bokan Series